Kefersteinia may refer to:
 Kefersteinia (polychaete), a polychaete genus in the family Hesionidae
 Kefersteinia (plant), a plant genus in the family Orchidaceae